Brian William Buckley (29 March 1935 – 26 May 2013) was an Australian rules footballer who played with Footscray in the Victorian Football League (VFL).		

After football he became a teacher, journalist, a political press secretary for Phillip Lynch and then a political consultant. Married twice, including to former mayor of the City of Yarra, Jackie Fristacky, Buckley died in 2013 from cancer.

Notes

External links 
		

1935 births
2013 deaths
Australian rules footballers from Melbourne
Western Bulldogs players
Gisborne Football Club players
Oakleigh Football Club players
People educated at Parade College
Deaths from cancer in Victoria (Australia)
Australian political consultants
Press secretaries
People from Footscray, Victoria